Riikola is a Finnish surname. Notable people with the surname include:

Juuso Riikola (born 1993), Finnish ice hockey player
Simo-Pekka Riikola (born 1992), Finnish ice hockey player

Finnish-language surnames